Patrick Joseph Kearney represents the 4th Plymouth District in the Massachusetts House of Representatives. The district comprises the towns of Marshfield and Scituate. Kearney serves on the House Committee on Ways and Means, the Joint Committee on Cannabis Policy, the Joint Committee on Election Laws, the Joint Committee on Housing, and the Joint Committee on Ways and Means. He is a commissioned officer in the US Navy Reserve. He is the son of former state representative Maryanne Lewis.

See also
 2019–2020 Massachusetts legislature
 2021–2022 Massachusetts legislature

References

Living people
21st-century American politicians
Democratic Party members of the Massachusetts House of Representatives
Massachusetts Maritime Academy alumni
People from Scituate, Massachusetts
Year of birth missing (living people)